General Borisov may refer to:

Arkady Borisov (1901–1942), Soviet Red Army major general
Vladimir Borisov (1902–1941), Soviet Red Army major general
Vyacheslav Borisov (1955–2021), Russian Federation major general